The Massachusetts Magazine was published in Boston, Massachusetts, from 1789 through 1796. Also called the Monthly Museum of Knowledge and Rational Entertainment, it specialized in "poetry, music, biography, history, physics, geography, morality, criticism, philosophy, mathematics, agriculture, architecture, chemistry, novels, tales, romances, translations, news, marriages, deaths, meteorological observations, etc. etc." It was intended as "a kind of thermometer, by which the genius, taste, literature, history, politics, arts, manners, amusements and improvements of the age and nation, may be ascertained." Founded by Isaiah Thomas, the magazine was also published by Ebenezer T. Andrews (1789-1793), Ezra W. Weld (1794), Samuel Hill (1794), William Greenough (1794-1795), Alexander Martin (1795-1796), Benjamin Sweetser (1796), and James Cutler (1796). It was edited by Isaiah Thomas, Thaddeus Mason Harris (1795-1796), and William Bigelow (1796). Contributors included Joseph Dennie (as Socialis), William Dunlap, Benjamin Franklin, Sarah Wentworth Morton (as Philenia), Judith Sargent Murray (as Constantia), and Christian Gullager. Sheet music was published with some issues, including compositions by Hans Gram.

Early 20th century publication
The Massachusetts Magazine was published in Salem, Massachusetts from 1908 through early 1918. The periodical was founded by Frank A. Gardner, M.D., Charles A. Flagg (of the Library of Congress), and Albert W. Dennis. The Editor was Rev. Thomas Franklin Waters, the noted researcher and author of Ipswich, MA. With a quarterly publishing schedule, the magazine was "devoted to History, Genealogy, and Biography."

A regular theme dealt with "Pilgrims and Planters" written by Lucie M. Gardner. Too, the magazine included research papers. An example would be the articles in the regimental history series, such as "Col. John Glover's Marblehead Regiment" (author, Dr. F.A. Gardner) that is found in Vol. I, No. 1. Gardner did a series of these "monographs" with the 25th of the series appearing in Vol. XI, No. 1 (January, 1918). In Vol. VIII, No.1, the theme was celebrating the centennial year (post the closing of the War of 1812) starting with an essay by John Davis Long (32nd Governor of Massachusetts) and others.

The series on Regimental History used those units present at the Siege of Boston. In the first five volumes, additional material related to participation by Massachusetts appeared in a series, Department of the American Revolution.

Other advisory editors included Thomas Wentworth Higginson, John M. McClintock (publisher of The New England Magazine), and George Sheldon (preservationist).

The Essex Antiquarian (Sidney Perley) reported this about The Massachusetts Magazine: "This magazine is intended to be the official organ of several of the colonial societies."

Volume VI, No. 4 - pages 159-190 provided a serial addition from F.M. Thompson who described vigilante activity in Montana from a first-hand view. One incident involved Talk:Henry Plummer and his gang of ruffians who were hanged. F.M. returned to Massachusetts and was a Judge in Greenfield, MA. This portion of the TMM was taken by Montana as the content for their book, A Tenderfoot in Montana in 2004. List of F.M.'s series: Judge Francis M. Thompson.

References

Further reading
 Herbert R. Brown. "Elements of Sensibility in the Massachusetts Magazine". American Literature, I (1929).
 Herbert R. Brown. "Richardson and Sterne in the Massachusetts Magazine". The New England Quarterly, Vol. 5, No. 1 (January 1932), pp. 65–82.
 Beverly Jean Reed. "Reading the traveling exhibition show: 'Massachusetts Magazine' and the visual/verbal construction of the American woman" (dissertation). Purdue Univ., 2000.

External links

 
 Massachusetts Magazine, 11 Volumes, 1908-1918, Hathi Trust  
 Charles Alcott Flagg (1870-1920). OnLineBooks at penn.edu
 Albert W. Dennis (1908) Who's Who along the North Shore 
 Frank A. Gardner, M.D., list at Hathi Trust
 Thomas Franklin Waters (1851-1919), profile at Escapes North


18th century in Boston
1789 establishments in Massachusetts
1796 disestablishments in the United States
Defunct literary magazines published in the United States
Magazines established in 1789
Magazines disestablished in 1796
Magazines published in Boston